Gabriele Raja (born 26 January 2000) is an Italian footballer who plays as a midfielder for Serie D side Ligorna.

Club career
Raja started his career in Genoa, he signed to Serie D side Albissola in the summer of 2017. The team promoted to Serie C at the end of the season, Raja made his professional debut in the first round of 2018–19 season, coming on as a substitute in the 71st minute for Davide Sibilia in the 3–2 home loss against Olbia.

On 12 July 2019, he signed with Arezzo. On 31 January 2020, he joined Giana Erminio on loan.

For the 2021–22 season, he joined Ligorna in Serie D.

References

Sources
 
 

2000 births
Footballers from Genoa
Living people
Association football midfielders
Italian footballers
Serie C players
Serie D players
Genoa C.F.C. players
Albissola 2010 players
S.S. Arezzo players
A.S. Giana Erminio players